Stephen Dane Evans (born November 19, 1993) is an American professional Canadian football quarterback for the BC Lions of the Canadian Football League (CFL). He played college football at Tulsa. He has also been a member of the Philadelphia Eagles and Hamilton Tiger-Cats.

College career
Evans passed for 3,102 yards as a sophomore in 2014. In 2015, he completed 305 of 485 passes for 4,332 yards and 25 touchdowns and ranked eighth among NCAA Division I FBS quarterbacks in passing yardage. As a senior, he passed for 3,348 yards and 32 touchdowns.

Statistics

Professional career
Evans was rated the 25th best quarterback in the 2017 NFL Draft by NFLDraftScout.com.

Philadelphia Eagles 
After going undrafted in the 2017 NFL Draft, Evans signed with the Philadelphia Eagles on June 30, 2017. He was waived on September 1, 2017.

Hamilton Tiger-Cats 
On October 3, 2017, Evans was signed to the Hamilton Tiger-Cats' practice roster. On November 2, 2017, he was promoted to the active roster. Evans made his first career CFL start on November 3, 2018, throwing for 315 yards in a 30–28 loss against the Montreal Alouettes. He finished the season having played in three games, completing 26 of 42 pass attempts for 383 yards with two touchdowns and two interceptions.

On April 9, 2019, Evans signed a contract extension with Hamilton through the 2021 season. He began the season as the backup quarterback and came in relief of injured starting quarterback Jeremiah Masoli in Week 7 of the 2019 season to lead the Ti-Cats to victory, moving them into first place in the league with a 5–1 record. In the following days, it was revealed that Masoli suffered a torn ACL injury and would miss the remainder of the season; thrusting Evans into the starting role. Evans started 11 of the last 12 games of the season, and was named a CFL Top Performer for the month of September. He finished the regular season having completed 298 passes out of 413 attempts for 3,754 passing yards, 21 passing touchdowns, and 13 interceptions. He had a 9–2 record as a starter and led the Tiger-Cats to a first place finish in the East Division. In his first career playoff start, he completed 21 passes out of 36 attempts for 386 yards, including one touchdown and one interception, en route to his first playoff win and berth in the 107th Grey Cup. The Tiger Cats were defeated by the Winnipeg Blue Bombers in the championship match.

Evans restructured his contract with the Tiger-Cats in January 2020; however the 2020 season was cancelled due to the Covid-19 pandemic. During the 2020 football season, Evans was hired as a graduate assistant by the University of North Texas. Evans began the 2021 season as the backup to Jeremiah Masoli, however he was named the starter for the team's Week 4 game against the Montreal Alouettes. He suffered a lower-body injury partway though the team's Week 6 game against the Toronto Argonauts: On September 13, 2021, it was announced that Evans would miss four to six weeks recovering. On October 19, 2021, the Ti-Cats announced that Evans had been activated from injured reserve. Evans played in the second half of the final game of the season for the Ticats, securing a 24–3 win. After Masoli got off to a slow start in the Eastern Final against the Argonauts Evans replaced him and completed all 16 of his pass attempts for 249 yards and a touchdown leading Hamilton to a Grey Cup birth. Following the win, Ticats head coach Orlando Steinauer named Evans the starter for the 108th Grey Cup. However, Evans was injured in the second quarter and was forced to leave the game, being replaced by Masoli who was ultimately defeated by the Blue Bombers in overtime.

On January 12, 2022 Dane Evans signed a 2-year contract extension to remain with the Hamilton Tiger Cats. Evans began the 2022 season as the starting quarterback after Jeremiah Masoli signed with the Ottawa Redblacks in free agency: Matthew Shiltz was signed to be the backup quarterback. In the middle of the season Evans battled through a shoulder injury. After missing three of four games Evans returned to the starting lineup on September 17, 2022. By the end of the season Evans had fallen out of favour with the management in Hamilton. In late January 2023, Hamilton signed veteran quarterback Bo Levi Mitchell to a three-year contract with the expectation he will be their starting quarterback in 2023 and beyond. Given his large salary, the Tiger-Cats were reluctant to retain Evans as a backup quarterback, and thus his future in Hamilton was uncertain.

BC Lions
On February 23, 2023, Evans was traded to the BC Lions in exchange for a conditional fourth-round selection in the 2024 CFL Draft.According to TSN insider Farhan Lalji, Evans agreed to a restructured contract to reflect the fact he will be competing for the number two quarterback role behind presumed starter Vernon Adams Jr. His base salary in 2023 was reported at $94,000 and could earn up to a maximum of $151,000 if he achieves multiple incentive based bonuses.

CFL statistics

Personal life
Evans is of Native American ancestry, belonging to the Wichita; his great-grandmother, Doris McLemore, was the last fluent speaker of the Wichita language.

References

External links
 BC Lions bio

1993 births
Living people
Players of American football from Oklahoma
People from Chickasha, Oklahoma
People from Sanger, Texas
Players of American football from Texas
American football quarterbacks
Canadian football quarterbacks
American players of Canadian football
Tulsa Golden Hurricane football players
Philadelphia Eagles players
Hamilton Tiger-Cats players
Native American players of American football
BC Lions players